The 2020 WAC men's basketball tournament was to be the postseason men's basketball tournament for the Western Athletic Conference during the 2019–20 season. All tournament games were to be played at the Orleans Arena in Paradise, Nevada, from March 12–14, 2020. The tournament champion would have received the WAC's automatic bid to the 2020 NCAA tournament.

On March 12, both the WAC Tournament and the NCAA Tournaments were cancelled amid the COVID-19 pandemic.

Seeds
8 of the 9 teams in the WAC are eligible to compete in the conference tournament. California Baptist is ineligible due to their transition from Division II to Division I. Teams will be seeded by record within the conference, with a tiebreaker system to seed teams with identical conference records.

Schedule and results

Bracket

References

External links
2020 Western Athletic Conference Men's and Women's Basketball Championships

Tournament
WAC men's basketball tournament
WAC men's basketball tournament
Basketball competitions in the Las Vegas Valley
College basketball tournaments in Nevada
WAC men's basketball tournament
WAC men's basketball tournament
College sports tournaments in Nevada